Drobna drabnitsa is a Belarusian drinking song. The literal translation of the title would be "trifle of trifles", but in this context would mean something like . Known under several other titles, viz "Ad panyadzyelku da panyadzyelku", "Basota" or "Halota" ( or).

Belarusian lyrics

English translation (incomplete) 
Trifle of trifles, trifle of trifles
Rain is mizzling down
Poor ne’er-do-wells gathered together
And are getting drunk

Drinking the spirits, drinking the spirits,
Gonna drink the wine
Dare someone mock us a little
Will be beaten down
...

Note: proper names and places’ names are rendered in BGN/PCGN.

References
 Беларускія народныя песні. У чатырох тамах. Запіс Р. Шырмы. Т.2. – Мн. : Дзярж. выдавецтва БССР : Рэдакцыя музычнай літаратуры, 1960.

Drinking songs
Belarusian folk songs
Songwriter unknown
Year of song missing